Colson is both a surname and a given name. Notable people with the name include:

Surname
 Audrey Butt Colson (born 1926), British social anthropologist
 Bonzie Colson (born 1996), American basketball player for Maccabi Tel Aviv of the Israeli Basketball Premier League 
 Charles Colson (1931–2012), U.S. counsel for Richard Nixon and (later) evangelical Christian leader; father of Emily Colson
 Christian Colson (born 1968), British film producer
 Clément Colson (1853–1939), French economist
 David Grant Colson (1861–1904), U.S. politician from Kentucky
 Elizabeth Colson (1917-2016), U.S. social anthropologist
 Eugene Colson ( during WWII), Belgian resistance fighter
 Ethalinda Colson (stage name, Kathryn Adams; 1893–1959), U.S. silent film actress
 F. D. Colson (died 1958), U.S. rower, rowing coach, and lawyer
 Gail Colson (born ?), British music manager
 Gary Colson (born 1934), U.S. basketball coach
 Greg Colson (born 1956), U.S. artist known for wall sculptures ("stickmaps", "piecharts", etc.)
 Guillaume-François Colson (1785–1860), French historical painter
 Henri Colson (1819–1900), Belgian engineer, industrialist, professor, and politician
 Jaime Colson (1901–1975), modernist painter of the Dominican Republic
 Jean Claude Gilles Colson (stage name, Bellecour; 1725–1778), French actor
 Jean-François Gilles Colson (1733–1803), French painter
 Jeff Colson (born 1957), U.S. painter and sculptor
 John Colson (1680–1760), British clergyman and mathematician
 Kevin Colson (1937-2018), Australian actor
 Loyd Colson (born 1947), U.S. baseball pitcher
 Ms Von Colson ( 1984), German European Court of Justice plaintiff [see: Von Colson v Land Nordrhein-Westfalen]
 Osborne Colson (1916–2006), Canadian figure skater and coach
 Sam Colson (born 1951), U.S. javelin thrower and Olympic competitor
 Sean Colson (born 1975), U.S. basketball player
 Sydney Colson (born 1989), U.S. basketball player
 Ted Colson (1881–1950), Australian bushman, pastoralist, and pioneer

In fiction:

 Zachary Colson, character from Wing Commander II
 Colson, son of Wulfgar, character from The Icewind Dale Trilogy [see: Wulfgar (Forgotten Realms)]

Given name
 Colson Whitehead (born 1969) U.S. novelist
 Colson Baker (born 1990)

See also
 Colson House, a series of historic homes
 Colsons
 Colston
 Coulson